In mathematics, the structure theorem for Gaussian measures shows that the abstract Wiener space construction is essentially the only way to obtain a strictly positive Gaussian measure on a separable Banach space. It was proved in the 1970s by Kallianpur–Sato–Stefan and Dudley–Feldman–le Cam.

There is the earlier result due to H. Satô (1969)  which proves that "any Gaussian measure on a separable Banach space is an  abstract Wiener measure in the sense of  L. Gross". The result by Dudley et al. generalizes this result to the setting of Gaussian measures on a general topological vector space.

Statement of the theorem

Let γ be a strictly positive Gaussian measure on a separable Banach space (E, || ||). Then there exists a separable Hilbert space (H, 〈 , 〉)  and a map i : H → E such that i : H → E is an abstract Wiener space with γ = i∗(γH), where γH is the canonical Gaussian cylinder set measure on H.

References

 

Banach spaces
Probability theorems
Theorems in measure theory